Kalawa Jazmee Records is an independent record label based in South Africa.  The label is known for its contribution to the development of the Kwaito genre of music in South Africa.

Artists 
 Oskido
 Professor
 Mandla Mofokeng
 Trompies
 DJ Maphorisa
 Uhuru
 Vigro Deep
 Boom Shaka
 Mafikizolo 
 Candy Tsa Mandebele
 DJ Zinhle
Busiswa

References

External links
 Kalawa Jazmee Records on Discogs

South African record labels
Companies based in Johannesburg
Culture of Johannesburg